Haykel Jerbi (born ) Tunisian male volleyball player. He was part of the Tunisia men's national volleyball team at the 2010 FIVB Volleyball Men's World Championship in Italy. He played for ASHAOUARIA.

Clubs
 ASHAOUARIA (2010)

References

1988 births
Living people
Tunisian men's volleyball players
Place of birth missing (living people)